Roger Philip Mason Jr. (born September 10, 1980) is an American former professional basketball player. He is the former deputy executive director of the NBA Players Association. He is the former president and commissioner of Big3.

Early career
Mason lived in Silver Spring, Maryland where he attended primary school at Calvary Lutheran School. He first attended high school at Sidwell Friends School where he was named MVP at the school as a freshman. He then transferred to Our Lady of Good Counsel High School for his sophomore, junior, and senior years. Mason led Good Counsel to their best basketball year ever, with 29 wins and a number 19 final ranking on the USA Today Super 25 list. At Good Counsel he scored a total of 1,426 points. He was named 1999 All-Metropolitan first team by The Washington Post, All-Washington Catholic Athletic Conference (WCAC), and all-county by the Montgomery Journal newspaper. He was also named 1999 Powerade "Mr. Basketball", awarded to the best player in the Washington, D.C. area.

College career
Mason played collegiately at the University of Virginia (UVA). In 2001, he was named to the All-Atlantic Coast Conference (ACC) third team. Mason set a free throw percentage record in UVA history with 86.89 percent made (since passed by Malcolm Brogdon) and is currently fourth on the ACC's all-time list for free throw percentage.

Professional career

NBA
Mason was selected with the 31st overall pick by the Chicago Bulls in the 2002 NBA draft after his junior year. On August 12, 2002, he signed a multi-year deal with the Bulls.

On December 15, 2003, he was traded to the Toronto Raptors for Rick Brunson. On December 16, 2004, he was waived by the Raptors.

In September 2006, he signed a one-year deal with the Washington Wizards. In September 2007, he re-signed with the Wizards on a one-year deal. His role significantly expanded during the season when Gilbert Arenas and Antonio Daniels were injured. He responded by putting up the best numbers in his NBA career.

On July 11, 2008, Mason was signed to the San Antonio Spurs for a two-year $7.3 million contract. On Christmas Day 2008, he made a buzzer-beating three-point shot to beat the Phoenix Suns. Mason would finish the season with career highs in points, rebounds, and assists per game and it was also his only time to play all 82 games of a season.

On August 10, 2010, Mason signed a contract with the New York Knicks.

On December 9, 2011, Mason signed a one-year veteran minimum contract with the Washington Wizards. On April 16, 2012, Mason was waived by the Wizards to create a roster spot for Morris Almond.

On August 3, 2012, Mason signed a contract with the New Orleans Hornets.

On September 27, 2013, Mason signed with the Miami Heat.

On February 20, 2014, Mason was traded to the Sacramento Kings in exchange for a future conditional 2015 second-round pick. He was later waived the same day. Thus, Mason Jr.'s final NBA game was when he was still a member of the Miami Heat. As his final game was on January 26, 2014 in a 113 - 101 win over the San Antonio Spurs in which he recorded 3 points in 4 and half minutes of playing time.

International
In January 2005, he signed with Olympiacos of Greece for the rest of the 2004–05 season. Later that year, he signed with Hapoel Jerusalem for the 2005–06 season who got sponsored by billionaire Arkadi Gaydamak shortly before, he quickly became major player of the team and led it to the Uleb Cup semi-finals and to the Israeli League Finals.

NBA career statistics

Regular season 

|-
| style="text-align:left;"| 
| style="text-align:left;"| Chicago
| 17 || 0 || 6.6 || .355 || .333 || 1.000 || .7 || .7 || .2 || .0 || 1.8
|-
| style="text-align:left;"| 
| style="text-align:left;"| Chicago
| 3 || 0 || 14.3 || .091 || .167 || - || 1.0 || 1.0 || .3 || .0 || 1.0
|-
| style="text-align:left;"| 
| style="text-align:left;"| Toronto
| 23 || 3 || 12.4 || .356 || .364 || .864 || 1.2 || 1.0 || .4 || .3 || 4.0
|-
| style="text-align:left;"| 
| style="text-align:left;"| Washington
| 62 || 0 || 7.9 || .330 || .324 || .875 || .7 || .6 || .2 || .1 || 2.7
|-
| style="text-align:left;"| 
| style="text-align:left;"| Washington
| 80 || 9 || 21.4 || .443 || .398 || .873 || 1.6 || 1.7 || .5 || .2 || 9.1
|-
| style="text-align:left;"| 
| style="text-align:left;"| San Antonio
| 82 || 71 || 30.4 || .425 || .421 || .890 || 3.1 || 2.1 || .5 || .1 || 11.8
|-
| style="text-align:left;"| 
| style="text-align:left;"| San Antonio
| 79 || 5 || 19.2 || .389 || .333 || .794 || 2.1 || 1.7 || .4 || .2 || 6.3
|-
| style="text-align:left;"| 
| style="text-align:left;"| New York
| 26 || 0 || 12.3 || .338 || .364 || .700 || 1.7 || .8 || .2 || .1 || 2.9
|-
| style="text-align:left;"| 
| style="text-align:left;"| Washington
| 52 || 0 || 13.4 || .399 || .383 || .778 || 1.3 || .9 || .3 || .1 || 5.5
|-
| style="text-align:left;"| 
| style="text-align:left;"| New Orleans
| 69 || 13 || 17.7 || .433 || .415 || .907 || 1.9 || 1.1 || .4 || .2 || 5.3
|-
| style="text-align:left;"| 
| style="text-align:left;"| Miami
| 25 || 2 || 10.4 || .373 || .354 || 1.000 || .9 || .8 || .2 || .0 || 3.0
|- class="sortbottom"
| style="text-align:center;" colspan="2"| Career
| 518 || 103 || 17.7 || .408 || .383 || .866 || 1.7 || 1.3 || .4 || .1 || 6.3

Playoffs 

|-
| style="text-align:left;"| 2007
| style="text-align:left;"| Washington
| 4 || 0 || 14.0 || .438 || .500 || .833 || .5 || .3 || .3 || .0 || 6.0
|-
| style="text-align:left;"| 2008
| style="text-align:left;"| Washington
| 6 || 0 || 21.5 || .404 || .235 || .750 || .8 || 1.0 || .5 || .2 || 8.0
|-
| style="text-align:left;"| 2009
| style="text-align:left;"| San Antonio
| 5 || 3 || 21.6 || .375 || .368 || .667 || 1.6 || 1.8 || .2 || .0 || 6.6
|-
| style="text-align:left;"| 2010
| style="text-align:left;"| San Antonio
| 6 || 0 || 10.2 || .083 || .143 || - || .7 || .3 || .2 || .0 || .5
|-
| style="text-align:left;"| 2011
| style="text-align:left;"| New York
| 3 || 0 || 18.3 || .389 || .385 || - || 1.3 || 1.0 || .3 || .0 || 6.3
|- class="sortbottom"
| style="text-align:center;" colspan="2"| Career
| 24 || 3 || 17.0 || .368 || .333 || .765 || 1.0 || .9 || .3 || .0 || 5.3

References

External links

Virginia bio

1980 births
Living people
African-American basketball players
American expatriate basketball people in Canada
American expatriate basketball people in Greece
American expatriate basketball people in Israel
American men's basketball players
Basketball players from Maryland
Basketball players from Washington, D.C.
Big3 people
Chicago Bulls draft picks
Chicago Bulls players
Hapoel Jerusalem B.C. players
Israeli Basketball Premier League players
Miami Heat players
New Orleans Hornets players
New York Knicks players
Olympiacos B.C. players
San Antonio Spurs players
Shooting guards
Toronto Raptors players
Universiade bronze medalists for the United States
Universiade medalists in basketball
Virginia Cavaliers men's basketball players
Washington Wizards players
Medalists at the 2001 Summer Universiade
21st-century African-American sportspeople
20th-century African-American people